Zascelis is a genus of hidden snout weevils in the beetle family Curculionidae. There are more than 80 described species in Zascelis.

Species
These 86 species belong to the genus Zascelis:

 Zascelis affaber Champion, 1905
 Zascelis angusticollis Fiedler, 1948
 Zascelis appendiculata Fiedler, 1953
 Zascelis auricomata Fiedler, 1954
 Zascelis braccata Fiedler, 1954
 Zascelis brevicollis Champion, 1905
 Zascelis breyeri Kuschel, 1950
 Zascelis carinipennis Hustache, 1924
 Zascelis carinipes Champion, 1905
 Zascelis coarctirostris Fiedler, 1954
 Zascelis conicipennis Fiedler, 1948
 Zascelis consputus Fiedler, 1942
 Zascelis curvirostris Fiedler, 1954
 Zascelis cyclops Fiedler, 1948
 Zascelis dentipes Fiedler, 1954
 Zascelis discreta Fiedler, 1954
 Zascelis elongata Fiedler, 1954
 Zascelis erythrops Fiedler, 1954
 Zascelis excisa Fiedler, 1948
 Zascelis excisipennis Fiedler, 1948
 Zascelis extensa Fiedler, 1948
 Zascelis filicornis Fiedler, 1953
 Zascelis fissicostata Fiedler, 1953
 Zascelis flavidior Fiedler, 1942
 Zascelis flavopilosa Fiedler, 1948
 Zascelis fossulatifrons Fiedler, 1953
 Zascelis foveatifrons Fiedler, 1954
 Zascelis fraterna Fiedler, 1954
 Zascelis geminatus Champion, 1905
 Zascelis glabratoides Voss, 1940
 Zascelis glabratus Champion, 1905
 Zascelis glabriventris Fiedler, 1948
 Zascelis grisescens Fiedler, 1954
 Zascelis hamifera Fiedler, 1948
 Zascelis infirma Fiedler, 1948
 Zascelis ingrata Fiedler, 1954
 Zascelis irrorata LeConte, 1876
 Zascelis laeviceps Fiedler, 1948
 Zascelis laevirostris Fiedler, 1948
 Zascelis lata Fiedler, 1948
 Zascelis latecarinata Fiedler, 1948
 Zascelis latifrons Fiedler, 1948
 Zascelis linearis Fiedler, 1948
 Zascelis lobata Fiedler, 1954
 Zascelis longirostris Fiedler, 1954
 Zascelis macera Fiedler, 1954
 Zascelis macrops Fiedler, 1948
 Zascelis marginata Fiedler, 1948
 Zascelis marginaticollis Fiedler, 1948
 Zascelis marginella Fiedler, 1948
 Zascelis microps Fiedler, 1948
 Zascelis modesta Fiedler, 1954
 Zascelis navicularis Fiedler, 1954
 Zascelis nepticula Fiedler, 1954
 Zascelis notandirostris Fiedler, 1948
 Zascelis oblonga Horn, 1895
 Zascelis oblongovalis Fiedler, 1948
 Zascelis ovalis Fiedler, 1948
 Zascelis ovatula Fiedler, 1954
 Zascelis parvicollis Fiedler, 1948
 Zascelis protensa Fiedler, 1954
 Zascelis punctatocostalis Fiedler, 1948
 Zascelis pusilla Fiedler, 1948
 Zascelis recticollis Fiedler, 1948
 Zascelis rectipennis Fiedler, 1954
 Zascelis rhomboidalis Fiedler, 1948
 Zascelis rudicollis Fiedler, 1948
 Zascelis rufipennis Fiedler, 1948
 Zascelis rufipes Fiedler, 1948
 Zascelis rugosa Champion, 1905
 Zascelis semiplanata Fiedler, 1948
 Zascelis serripes Leconte, 1876
 Zascelis sexualis Fiedler, 1948
 Zascelis sororcula Fiedler, 1954
 Zascelis speculifera Fiedler, 1948
 Zascelis squamigera Leconte, 1876
 Zascelis stenosicollis Fiedler, 1954
 Zascelis strigosa Fiedler, 1954
 Zascelis striolatus Fiedler, 1942
 Zascelis subelongata Fiedler, 1954
 Zascelis subobtusa Fiedler, 1948
 Zascelis sulcatocostata Fiedler, 1954
 Zascelis sulcifrons Champion, 1905
 Zascelis suturalis Fiedler, 1948
 Zascelis truncata Fiedler, 1948
 Zascelis ventralis Fiedler, 1948

References

Further reading

 
 
 

Cryptorhynchinae
Articles created by Qbugbot